Romio Ricardo Goliath (born 13 September 1999) is a Namibian Greco-Roman wrestler.  He is multiple medalist at the African Championships in the 55 kg category. He competed at the 2019 African Games in the Greco-Roman 60 kg event.

Major results

References

External links
 

1999 births
Living people
Namibian male sport wrestlers
Competitors at the 2019 African Games
Place of birth missing (living people)
African Games competitors for Namibia
African Wrestling Championships medalists
Wrestlers at the 2022 Commonwealth Games
Commonwealth Games competitors for Namibia
20th-century Namibian people
21st-century Namibian people